Rhipiceridae is a family of beetles found worldwide. The larva of rhipicerids are parasitoids of cicada nymphs. Rhipiceridae and Dascillidae form the super family Dascilloidea, within the Elateriformia.

Taxonomic History 
The taxonomic history of Rhipiceridae began with J. Fabricius who described Hispa mystacina in 1775, which was later included in the new genus Rhipicera by Latreille (1817) who rightly noticed that the Fabrician species did not belong to Hispa and placed it in the tribe ‘Cebrionites’ along with Cebrio, Dascillus and Scirtes. Since then W. Kirby, J. O. Westwood and others described several new species of Rhipicera from Australia and South America.

Subfamilies and Distribution
Rhipiceridae includes seven genera and about a hundred described species divided into two subfamilies, Rhipicerinae and Sandalinae. Sandalinae include most of the species and are known from North and South America, Africa, south-eastern Europe and Asia, while much less numerous Rhipicerinae, from Chile, New Caledonia and Australia, is a monophyletic lineage supported by several unambiguous apomorphies, like antennae composed of more than 11 antennomeres, relatively well developed maxillary galea and incomplete lateral pronotal carina.

Ecology 
The larval stages of riphicerids are external parasitioids on the nymphs of cicadas. In the species Sandalus niger, the eggs are deposited into the same holes and fissures in the bark of elm trees that cicadas deposit their eggs in. Subsequently, the first instars drop to the group alongside the cicada nymphs, and thereafter attach themselves to them. The abundance of adult rhipicerids tracks that of the emergence of adult cicadas.

Genera
Rhipicerinae:
 Oligorhipis Guérin-Méneville, 1843 Australia, New Caledonia
 Polymerius Philippi, 1871 Chile
 Polytomus Dalman, 1819 southern South America
 Rhipicera Latreille, 1817 Australia

Sandalinae:
 Arrhaphipterus Schaum, 1862 Europe to Central Asia
 Chamoerhipis Latreille, 1834 Africa
 Sandalus Knoch, 1801 Americas, Asia, Africa

Gallery

References

Further reading

External links

 

Elateriformia
Beetle families
Polyphaga families